The discography of The Wonder Years, an American rock band, consists of seven studio albums, two compilation albums and twelve extended plays.

Studio albums

Compilation albums

Extended plays

Split singles

Other appearances

Videography

References

Discographies of American artists
Pop punk group discographies